A by-election was held in the Dáil Éireann Cork South-Central constituency in Ireland on 23 October 1998. It followed the death of  Fine Gael Teachta Dála (TD) Hugh Coveney on 14 March 1998.

The election was won by Simon Coveney of Fine Gael and son of Hugh Coveney. The other candidates being Sinead Behan for Fianna Fáil, Cork City Councillor and former TD Toddy O'Sullivan for the Labour Party, Cork City Councillor Dan Boyle for the Green Party, Henry Cremin for Sinn Féin, Peter Kelly for the Progressive Democrats, Benny Cooney as an Independent, Brian McEnery for Natural Law and Jim Tallon as an Independent.

Dan Boyle would go on to represent the constituency as a TD in the future.

Result

See also
List of Dáil by-elections
Dáil constituencies

References

External links
https://electionsireland.org/result.cfm?election=1997B&cons=61&ref=118
http://irelandelection.com/election.php?elecid=41&electype=2&constitid=7

1998 in Irish politics
28th Dáil
By-elections in the Republic of Ireland
Elections in County Cork
October 1998 events in Europe
1998 elections in the Republic of Ireland